Natalya Pavlovna Medvedeva (18 December 1915 – 12 August 2007) was a Russian film and stage actress.

Medvedeva's mother was an actress, whereas her father, Pavel Nikolaevich Medvedev, was a literary scholar and President of St. Petersburg Union of Writers; he was executed in 1938 and rehabilitated in 1957. Medvedeva studied acting at the Saint Petersburg State Theatre Arts Academy (1939–1943). She was already married by then, and when her husband was sent to Sverdlovsk, she followed him there and in 1943–1944 acted at the Sverdlovsk drama theater. Next year the family moved to Moscow, where Medveva worked in drama theaters and since 1952 acted in films and TV series. She retired in 1979 and focused on raising her daughter Galina.

Filmography
Prestuplenie (1976) – school director Lidiya Dorokhina
Dom i khozyain (1967) – Zina
Lyudi i zveri (1962) – Valentina Pavlova
Chelovek menyaet kozhu (1960)
Lyudi na mostu (1960) – Anna Semyonovna
Trizhdy voskresshiy (1960) – Anna Shmelyeva 
Chelovek menyaet kozhu (1959) – Valentina Sinitsyna
Lyudi na mostu (1959) – Anna Semyonova Bulygina 
Ilya Muromets (1956) – Princess Apraksia
Za vitrinoi univermaga (1955) – Anna Andreeva
The Return of Vasili Bortnikov (1952) – Avdot'ya

References

External links
 
 

1915 births
2007 deaths
Actresses from Saint Petersburg
Russian State Institute of Performing Arts alumni